The Curaçao National Championship AA League, formerly referred to as Liga Amstel Bright and commonly known as the AA League (Liga Dòbel A), is a professional baseball league in Curaçao. Part of the Curaçao Baseball Federation (Federashon Beisbol Kòrsou, or FEBEKO), the AA League is the highest level of professional baseball in the small Caribbean nation.

The seven-team league plays a season that ends in October, with all games played at two stadiums, Stadion Johnny Vrutaal and Tio Daou Ballpark, in the capital of Willemstad. In 2023, the league's champion was invited to participate in the Caribbean Series for the first time. The champion, Wildcats KJ74, featured Curaçaoan-born major leaguers like Andrelton Simmons and Jonathan Schoop.

Current teams

References

External links
 

Baseball leagues in South America
Baseball in the Caribbean
Baseball in the Netherlands
Sports leagues established in 1975
Curaçao